The Grumman G-73 Mallard is a medium, twin-engined amphibious aircraft. Many have been modified by replacing the original Pratt & Whitney Wasp H radial engines with modern turboprop engines. Manufactured from 1946 to 1951, production ended when Grumman's larger SA-16 Albatross was introduced.

Design and development

Building on the success of the Goose and Widgeon, Grumman Aircraft developed  larger G-73 Mallard for commercial use. Retaining many of the features of the smaller aircraft, such as twin radial engines, high wings with underwing floats, retractable landing gear and a large straight tail, the company built 59 Mallards between 1946 and 1951. Unlike the smaller aircraft, the Mallard featured tricycle gear, stressed skin, a two-step hull and wingtip fuel tanks.

Operational history

The Mallard prototype first flew on 30 April 1946, with the first production aircraft entering service in September of that year. While the Mallard was designed for regional airline operations with two pilots and ten passengers, especially aimed at harbor-based, city-to-city hops on the eastern seaboard, postwar surplus aircraft sales and the availability of smaller airports limited market potential. A number of smaller air carriers did use the Mallard in its intended role, notably Tahiti-Hawaii Airlines and Pacific Western Airlines (Canada). However, most of the 59 Mallards delivered were for corporate use. A prominent user in the United States was Roy Fruehauf and the Fruehauf Trailer Corporation. Fruehauf owned and operated a fishing camp, Killarney Lodge at Georgian Bay, Canada, and ferried customers there from Detroit.  Another Detroiter, William Packer of General Motors, also owned a Mallard, which he often flew to Killarney. another Mallard was purchased in the early 1950s by the Aga Khan.

The Toronto Globe & Mail newspaper owned one for use as a "flying newsroom".

The Royal Egyptian Air Force used a Mallard as part of their Royal Flight; it was reportedly King Farouk's favourite aircraft.

The Mallard received a new lease on life in the 1970s when a number of airframes were refitted by Frakes Aviation with Pratt & Whitney Canada PT6A turbines and upgraded for 17 passengers, to become "Turbo Mallards." Today, through attrition, only 32 Mallards remain registered in the United States. Many of the rest are in use around the globe.

A similar program has been undertaken by Paspaley Pearling in combination with Aeronautical Engineers Australia to fit new engines and modernize its Mallard fleet, which is used to support its pearling operations in Northern Australia. The fleet has been extensively rebuilt and also refitted with PT6A turbines, and is currently undergoing a life extension program.

Incidents

Chalk's flight 101 in 2005

Chalk's Ocean Airways purchased Mallard N1208 from the Fruehauf Corporation and later acquired several other examples of the aircraft. The type received much attention after a Turbo Mallard, operating as Chalk's Ocean Airways Flight 101, crashed after takeoff from Miami Harbor on December 19, 2005, bound for Bimini, Bahamas. Eighteen passengers and two crew perished when the right wing separated from the fuselage of the 58-year-old aircraft. The cause of the accident was determined by the subsequent investigation to be undetected cracks and/or corrosion in the wing spar.

Prior to 2005, Chalk's Ocean Airways had an exemplary safety record operating Mallards for many years between Florida and the Bahamas, having never had a passenger fatality since the company began operations in 1917.

Australia Day 2017 at Perth
An original radial-engine Mallard, registration VH-CQA, crashed into the Swan River in Perth, Western Australia, on 26 January, 2017, during Australia Day celebrations, killing both the pilot, Peter Lynch, and his passenger. The cause of the accident was listed as pilot error and poor procedures on the part of the CASA and the City of Perth.

Operators

Civil operators

Air Whitsunday (operated both the piston engine and turboprop engine variants)
Pearl Aviation (Paspaley Pearling Co.)
Trans Australia Airlines

Nordair (Turbo Mallard)
Pacific Western Airlines
 Netherlands New Guinea
Nederlandsche Nieuw Guinee Petroleum Maatschappij

 Antilles Air Boats
Chalk's Ocean Airways (operated both the piston engine and turboprop engine variants)
 Virgin Islands Seaplane Shuttle (operated both the piston engine and turboprop engine variants)

Military operators

Royal Egyptian Air Force

Specifications (G-73)

See also

References
Notes

Bibliography

  
 
 Hotson, Fred W. and Matthew E. Rodina. Grumman Mallard: The Enduring Classic. Scarborough, Ontario: Robin Brass Studio, 2006. .
 Thruelsen, Richard. The Grumman Story. New York: Praeger Publishers, Inc., 1976. .
 Winchester, Jim, ed. "Grumman Goose/Mallard." Biplanes, Triplanes and Seaplanes (The Aviation Factfile). Rochester, Kent, UK: Grange Books plc, 2004. .

External links

 "Grumman Hatches A Mallard", November 1946, Popular Science
 New York Times article about Chalk's accident 
 Aircraft Maintenance Technology article about Chalk's accident
 NTSB preliminary report on Chalk's accident DCA06MA010 of 19 December 2005
 Picture of CF-HPU Pacific Western Airlines operated Mallard in Tahsis, BC in late 1950s
 Picture of a Chalk's Mallard in Miami in 1996
 History of Chalk's Ocean Airways at answers.com
 Left at the Evening Star - selling a beloved Mallard
Grumman Mallard's and the Fruehauf Trailer Company

Mallard
1940s United States civil utility aircraft
Flying boats
Amphibious aircraft
High-wing aircraft
Aircraft first flown in 1946
Twin piston-engined tractor aircraft